Mert Naci Türker (born 16 August 1998) is a Turkish tennis player.

Türker has a career high ATP singles ranking of 1076 achieved on 25 June 2018. He also has a career high ATP doubles ranking of 645 achieved on 13 August 2018. Türker has won 1 ITF doubles title on the ITF Men's World Tennis Tour.

Türker made his main drew debut at the 2021 Antalya Open in the doubles draw, receiving a wildcard alongside Umut Akkoyun.

References

External links
 
 

1998 births
Living people
Turkish male tennis players
21st-century Turkish people